Gloeophyllum sepiarium, the rusty gilled polypore, is a wood decay fungus that causes a brown rot. Gloeophyllum sepiarium grows in thin, dark brown/green brackets on dead conifers. Often found on wood in lumberyards, the fruiting body grows for only one year, and produces spores in late summer and autumn. Its hymenial surface is distinctive from other polypores due to the presence of gills. Gloeophyllum sepiarium is inedible.

The cap is 2–15 wide, loosely fan-shaped, brown with a yellow-orange margin during growth, velvety then smooth, and leathery with a mild odor and taste. The spores are white, cylindrical, and smooth.

Similar species include Daedalea quercina, Lenzites betulina, and Trametes versicolor.

References

External links

Wood-decay fungi
Gloeophyllales
Fungi of Europe
Fungi of North America
Fungi described in 1783
Inedible fungi
Taxa named by Franz Xaver von Wulfen